Jade Alan Murray (born 23 September 1981) is an English footballer who played as a forward.

Club career
After progressing through the club's academy, Murray made two Football League appearances for Leyton Orient. During his time at the club, Murray had one-month loan spells with Chelmsford City and Sutton United. In February 2002, Murray was released by Leyton Orient, subsequently joining Barking & East Ham United. Murray also had spells with St Albans City and Ford United.

Personal life
In 2006, Murray was convicted of rape whilst working as a postman. In 2010, Murray was convicted for sexual assault. In 2015, Murray was selected to represent England at the Homeless World Cup in Amsterdam, Netherlands.

References

1981 births
Living people
Association football forwards
Footballers from Islington (district)
21st-century English criminals
Black British sportspeople
English male criminals
English footballers
Leyton Orient F.C. players
Chelmsford City F.C. players
Sutton United F.C. players
Barking & East Ham United F.C. players
St Albans City F.C. players
Redbridge F.C. players
English Football League players
British people convicted of sexual assault
English prisoners and detainees
English people convicted of rape